Simon-Olivier Fecteau (born July 28, 1975) is a Canadian director, actor, producer and screenwriter. He was nominated in 2008 for a Genie Award for Best Original Screenplay for Bluff with Marc-André Lavoie and David Gauthier. He was also the creator, writer, director, and star of the webseries "En audition avec Simon", where he plays an arrogant director who is auditioning actors.  In 2014, he starred in the TV series "Ces gars-là" along with fellow Canadian comedian Sugar Sammy.

Recognition 
 2008 Genie Award for Best Original Screenplay - Bluff - Nominee (with David Gauthier, David Gauthier)
 2006 Genie Award for Best Live Action Short Drama - The Remaining Days (Les Derniers jours) - Nominated (shared with: Guillaume Lespérance, Jean-François Lord)

References

External links
 

1975 births
Living people
Canadian male film actors
Film directors from Quebec
Canadian film editors
Film producers from Quebec
Canadian screenwriters in French
Canadian male television actors
Canadian television directors
Canadian television writers
French Quebecers
Canadian male television writers